Topsy and Eva is a 1927 American drama silent film directed by Del Lord and written by Catherine Chisholm Cushing, Scott Darling, Dudley Early and Lois Weber. D. W. Griffith also directed additional scenes. It is based on the two key female figures in Harriet Beecher Stowe's 1852 classic novel Uncle Tom's Cabin.

The film stars Rosetta Duncan, Vivian Duncan, Gibson Gowland, Noble Johnson and Marjorie Daw. The film was released on July 24, 1927, by United Artists.

Cast 
Rosetta Duncan as Topsy
Vivian Duncan as Eva
Gibson Gowland as Simon Leegree
Noble Johnson as Uncle Tom
Marjorie Daw as Marietta
Myrtle Ferguson as Aunt Ophelia
Nils Asther as George Shelby
Henry Victor as St. Claire

References

External links 
 

1927 films
1927 drama films
1920s American films
1920s English-language films
American black-and-white films
American silent feature films
Films based on works by Harriet Beecher Stowe
Films directed by Del Lord
Silent American drama films
Surviving American silent films
Uncle Tom's Cabin
United Artists films